Rockette Morton (born Mark Boston; July 14, 1949 in Salem, Illinois) is an American musician, best known as a bassist and guitarist for Captain Beefheart and the Magic Band in the 1960s and 1970s.

Career
In 1963, after moving to Lancaster, California, Boston joined up with future Magic Band member Bill Harkleroad (aka Zoot Horn Rollo) in a band named B.C. & the Cavemen. 

He was given the nickname "Rockette Morton" by Captain Beefheart after becoming a member of the Magic Band. Morton played on five of Beefheart's  albums: Trout Mask Replica (produced by Frank Zappa in 1969), Lick My Decals Off Baby (1970),  The Spotlight Kid (1972), Clear Spot (1972) and Unconditionally Guaranteed (1974). He originally played bass, but switched to rhythm guitar after former Little Feat bassist Roy Estrada joined the band.

In the book Lunar Notes: Zoot Horn Rollo's Captain Beefheart Experience, guitarist Bill Harkleroad details some of the tensions that arose between Beefheart and members of the band. These tensions led to a split in 1974, when Rockette Morton left to form Mallard with bandmates John French, Bill Harkleroad, and Art Tripp. Mallard released two albums, Mallard (1975) and In A Different Climate (1976). Following the band's demise, Morton continued performing in various groups as guitarist and bassist.

Morton released a solo album, Love Space, in 2003, about which he wrote: "If you enjoy listening to this music even half as much as I enjoyed recording it, I did my job." It was recorded at his music studio in Aiken, South Carolina.

Prior to the album's release he was featured in an article in the music magazine Stomp & Stammer (October 2002), titled "The Ring of Rockette Morton", in which he self-identified as "a space nut" and being "pro-space". He was 52 years old at the time and was living in a mobile home, decorated with alien and rocket ship models. 
 
In 2003 Morton and other former members of the Magic Band regrouped and embarked on a world tour, performing Captain Beefheart's music. They have continued to tour regularly as the Magic Band since then.

Discography

Captain Beefheart and the Magic Band 
Trout Mask Replica (1969)
Lick My Decals Off, Baby (1970)
The Spotlight Kid (1972)
Clear Spot (1972)
Unconditionally Guaranteed (1974)

Mallard 
Mallard
In a Different Climate

Solo 
Love Space (2003)

Guest appearances
Ant-Bee: Electronic Church Muzik (Barking Moondog, 2011)

Further reading 
 Harkleroad, Bill (1998). Lunar Notes: Zoot Horn Rollo's Captain Beefheart Experience. Interlink Publishing. .

References

External links
Extensive Biographical Information
Mallard (band) web pages online since 1995
Rockette Morton

1949 births
Living people
People from Salem, Illinois
American rock bass guitarists
American male bass guitarists
The Magic Band members
American rock guitarists
Rhythm guitarists
20th-century American guitarists
Nicknames
Nicknames in music